Men and Women is an extant short 1914 silent film produced by the Biograph Company and released by General Film Company. It is based on the 1890 play of the same name by David Belasco and Henry Churchill de Mille.  It stars Lionel Barrymore, Blanche Sweet and Marshall Neilan. Sweet and Neilan would later marry in real life.

Plot
Robert Stevens robs the bank where he is employed, and through the efforts of Calvin Stedman, the prosecuting attorney, he is sentenced to six years' imprisonment. While in jail his wife dies and his little daughter, Agnes, is placed in a convent. At the expiration of his sentence, Stevens locates his daughter and settles in Arizona, assuming the name of Stephen Rodman.

Cast

Lionel Barrymore - Stephen Rodman/Robert Stevens
Blanche Sweet - Agnes Rodman, Stephen's daughter
Fred Hearn - District Attorney Calvin Stedman
Gertrude Robinson - Ruth Prescott
Marshall Neilan - Will Prescott
Frank Crane - Ned Seabury (*as Frank Hall Crane)
Fred Herzog - Kirke, the broker
Hattie Delaro - Mrs Prescott
Claire McDowell - Mrs. Stephen Rodman
Frank M. Norcross - Cohen
Alan Hale - One of Kirke's Creditors
Antonio Moreno - Man in Kirke's Office
Gladys Egan - An Orphan (uncredited)
Lillian Gish (uncredited)
Vivian Prescott (uncredited)

Legacy
The story was refilmed by Paramount in 1925 as Men and Women.

See also
Lionel Barrymore filmography
Blanche Sweet filmography

References

External links
Men and Women at IMDb.com
allmovie/synopsis

1914 films
American films based on plays
Films directed by D. W. Griffith
Biograph Company films
1914 short films
American silent short films
Silent American drama films
1914 drama films
American black-and-white films
1910s American films